Moi's Bridge is a small town that has its roots both in Uasin Gishu County, Trans Nzoia County and Kakamega County, Kenya. It is a town that has since grown as an agricultural center with the third largest NCPB in East Africa. Moi's Bridge is an electoral ward of the Soy Constituency and Uasin Gishu County. It is an important Kenyan area, often named as the 'bread basket' of Kenya. Moi's Bridge is also a location in the Soy division of Uasin Gishu District.

Etymology
The town is named for the bridge across the Nzoia River which it grew around and as a result of. It was initially named Hoey's Bridge after Cecil Hoey, the original builder of the bridge. The name later changed to Moi's Bridge after independence, named after the second president Hon Daniel Toroitich arap Moi.

History
Cecil Hoey, one of the first European residents in the Trans-Nzoia region built a bridge across the Nzoia River so as to drive his ox teams over. A small settlement grew up around the bridge and this grew into the small town that is Moi's Bridge.

Economy
The major industry in the town is cereal storage. The National Cereals Board has a cereal storage depot located in the town which consists of eight large silos with a capacity of approximately 5 million tonnes of grain. It is one of the largest in the country and plays a significant role in Kenya's food security. In the recent past, Moi's Bridge has since taken a new shape with great engineers. Some of the growing industries includes quarry mining and milling firms.

Culture and social life
The town is polytheistic. The Kalenjin tribe first inhabited the area, followed by the Luhya community. The town and its surrounding area currently exists peacefully, sharing their cultural diversity, and thus let to a rich social life among the inhabitants.

Transport 

Moi's Bridge is located along the B2 road (Eldoret - Kitale Road). The C50 road leads from Moi's Bridge to Moiben in the west. Moi's Bridge is served by a railway station on the branch railway to Kitale. With the recent discovery of oil in the Turukana county, this road is expected to be improved as since it is here that it will aid the transportation of crude oil.

See also 
 Railway stations in Kenya

References 

Populated places in Uasin Gishu County